Visitation may refer to:

Law
 Visitation (law) or contact, the right of a non-custodial parent to visit with their children
 Prison visitation rights, the rules and conditions under which prisoners may have visitors

Music
 Visitation (Division Day album), 2009
 Visitation (Sam Jones album), 1978
 Visitation (Joe McPhee album), 1985
 Visitation (Jonah Sharp and Bill Laswell album), 1994
 "Visitation", an instrumental by Paul Chambers from Chambers' Music, 1956

Religion
 Visitation (Christianity), a liturgical feast day commemorating the visit of the Virgin Mary to St. Elizabeth
Visitation Order of enclosed nuns
 Visitation Convent
 Visitation Monastery
 Visitation Church, Montreal
 Canonical visitation, an inspection made by a clergyman authorised under Catholic canon law
 Visitation, a funeral custom where a mourner visits the deceased's family and views the body

Visual arts
Images of the Visitation (Christianity), the visit of the Virgin Mary to St. Elizabeth
 Visitation (Albertinelli), 1503
 Visitation (Cariani), c.1524-1528
 Visitation (Dürer), a 1503 engraving by Albrecht Dürer
 Visitation (Ghirlandaio), a 1491 painting by Domenico Ghirlandaio displayed in the Louvre
 Visitation (El Greco), a 1608–1613 painting by El Greco
 Visitation (Perugino), c.1472
 Visitation (Raphael), a c. 1517 painting by Raphael
 Visitation (Rubens), 1610s
 Visitation (Tintoretto, Bologna), c.1550
 Visitation (Tintoretto, Venice), c.1588
 Visitation (van der Weyden), c.1445

Other uses
 "Visitation" (Stargate Universe), an episode of Stargate Universe
 Heraldic visitation, a tour of inspection by a herald (or other officer-of-arms) to regulate and register coats of arms, and to record pedigrees; also, the written record of such a tour

See also 
 The Visitation (disambiguation)
 Visit (disambiguation)